The Dunedoo railway station is a heritage-listed closed railway station located on the Gwabegar railway line in Dunedoo, in the Warrumbungle Shire, New South Wales, Australia. The building is also known as Dunedoo Railway Station and yard group. The property was added to the New South Wales State Heritage Register on 2 April 1999.

Description 
Buildings
The station building was completed in 1910 with a  station on the up side, with a timber skillion roof. Opposite were a loop line and a goods siding with a loading bank, goods shed and gantry crane. At the north end on the down side were servicing facilities consisting of a turntable, coal stage, and engine and carriage sheds. In 1935 silos and a silo siding were added. By 1965, the loco servicing facilities were gone. A detached corrugated iron outshed, W.C. and lamp room, was completed in 1910. A corrugated iron trike shed in also contained with the heritage site. The station building has been restored and painted. There is no platform in existence. It is believed that the platform will be restored. Layout consists of main line (platform road) and loop (silo road). Wheat silos are also in service.

Landscape
A row of peppercorn trees on the south side of site is located on the road corridor and is managed by Warrunbungle Shire Council.

Heritage listing 
Dunedoo represents a typical modest country station complex in good condition. It exhibits a range of structures not often seen in an homogeneous group. Its relationship to the main street of Dunedoo, the park and the commercial premises is strong, the railway complex forming an integral part of the townscape. The row of peppercorns along the edge of the park and the railway boundary screen the site allowing views of the structures from the town. They form an integral and important part of the complex and form the major vista from the town. The site is a good example of a single line station that has not been affected by duplication. The structures are typical of those used throughout the state from early in the century to about 1920. Being built all about the same time, it is an excellent example of a location that has not significantly altered or been extended. This occurred as the facilities provided were adequate for the relatively small community and the railway was constructed at around the peak development of the area.

Dunedoo railway station was listed on the New South Wales State Heritage Register on 2 April 1999 having satisfied the following criteria.

The place possesses uncommon, rare or endangered aspects of the cultural or natural history of New South Wales.

This item is assessed as historically rare. This item is assessed as architecturally rare. This item is assessed as socially rare.

See also 

List of NSW TrainLink railway stations

References

Attribution 

New South Wales State Heritage Register
Dunedoo, New South Wales
Disused regional railway stations in New South Wales
Articles incorporating text from the New South Wales State Heritage Register
Railway stations in Australia opened in 1910